Chirocentrites is an extinct genus of Ichthyodectidae.

References
 Fishes of the World by Joseph S. Nelson   (page 103)

Ichthyodectiformes
Fossils of Italy